Personalization (broadly known as customization) consists of tailoring a service or a product to accommodate specific individuals, sometimes tied to groups or segments of individuals. A wide variety of organizations use personalization to improve customer satisfaction, digital sales conversion, marketing results, branding, and improved website metrics as well as for advertising. Personalization is a key element in social media and recommender systems. Personalization is affecting every sector of society -- work, leisure, and citizenship.

History of Personalization 
The idea of personalization is rooted in ancient rhetoric as part of the practice of an agent or communicator being responsive to the needs of the audience. When industrialization led to the rise of mass communication, the practice of message personalization diminished for a time. But the significant increase in the number of mass media outlets that use advertising as a primary revenue stream, and as they sought to attract customers through buying space and time in forms of entertainment and information, they made efforts to gain knowledge about the specific demographic and psychographic characteristics of readers and viewers.

Digital media and internet 
Another aspect of personalization is the increasing prevalence of open data on the internet. Many companies make their data available on the internet via APIs, web services, and open data standards. One such example is Ordnance Survey Open Data. Data made available in this way is structured to allow it to be inter-connected and re-used by third parties.

Data available from a user's social graph may be accessed by third-party application software to be suited to fit the personalized web page or information appliance.

Current open data standards on the internet include:
 Attention Profiling Mark-up Language (APML)
 DataPortability
 OpenID
 OpenSocial

Web pages
Web pages can be personalized based on the characteristics (interests, social category, context, etc.), actions (click on a button, open a link, etc.), intent (make a purchase, check the status of an entity), or any other parameter that can be identified and associated with an individual, therefore providing them with a tailored user experience. Note that the experience is rarely simply the accommodation of the user but a relationship between the user and the desires of the site designers in driving specific actions to achieve objectives (e.g. Increase sales conversion on a page). The term customization is often used when the site only uses explicit data such as product ratings or user preferences.

Technically, web personalization can be achieved by associating a visitor segment with a predefined action. Customizing the user experience based on behavioral, contextual and technical data is proven to have a positive impact on conversion rate optimization efforts. Associated actions can range from changing the content of a webpage, presenting a modal display, presenting interstitials, triggering a personalized email, or even automating a phone call to the user.

According to a 2014 study from research firm Econsultancy, less than 30% of e-commerce websites have invested in the field of web personalization. However, many companies now offer services for web personalization as well as web and email recommendation systems that are based on personalization or anonymously-collected user behaviors.

There are many categories of web personalization including
 Behavioral
 Contextual
 Technical
 Historic data
 Collaboratively filtered

There are several camps in defining and executing web personalization.  A few broad methods for web personalization may include:
 Implicit
 Explicit
 Hybrid

With implicit personalization, personalization is performed based on data learned from indirect observations of the user, such as items purchased on other sites or pages viewed. With explicit personalization, the web page (or information system) is changed by the user using the features provided by the system. Hybrid personalization combines the above two approaches to leverage both explicit user actions on the system and implicit data.

Web personalization can be linked to the notion of Adaptive hypermedia (AH). The main difference is that the former would usually work on what is considered an "open corpus hypermedia", whilst the latter would traditionally work on "closed corpus hypermedia." However, recent research directions in the AH domain take both closed and open corpus into account. Thus, the two fields are closely inter-related.

Personalization is also being considered for use in less overtly commercial applications to improve the user experience online. Internet activist Eli Pariser has documented that search engines like Google and Yahoo! News give different results to different people (even when logged out). He also points out social media site Facebook changes user's friend feeds based on what it thinks they want to see. Pariser warns that these algorithms can create a "filter bubble" that prevents people from encountering a diversity of viewpoints beyond their own, or which only presents facts which confirm their existing views.

On an intranet or B2E Enterprise Web portals, personalization is often based on user attributes such as department, functional area, or role. The term "customization" in this context refers to the ability of users to modify the page layout or specify what content should be displayed.

Map personalization 
Digital web maps are also being personalized. Google Maps change the content of the map based on previous searches and other profile information. Technology writer Evgeny Morozov has criticized map personalization as a threat to public space.

Mobile phones 

Over time mobile phones have seen an increased emphasis placed on user personalization. Far from the black and white screens and monophonic ringtones of the past, phones now offer interactive wallpapers and MP3 truetones. In the UK and Asia, WeeMees have become popular. WeeMees are three-dimensional characters that are used as wallpaper and respond to the tendencies of the user. Video Graphics Array (VGA) picture quality allows people to change their background with ease without sacrificing quality. All of these services are downloaded through the provider with the goal to make the user feel connected and more enjoyable to use the phone.

Print media and merchandise 

In print media, ranging from magazines to promotional publications, personalization uses databases of individual recipients' information. Not only does the written document address itself by name to the reader, but the advertising is targeted to the recipient's demographics or interests using fields within the database or list, such as "first name", "last name", "company", etc.

The term "personalization" should not be confused with variable data, which is a much more granular method of marketing that leverages both images and text with the medium, not just fields within a database. Although personalized children's books are created by companies who are using and leveraging all the strengths of variable data printing (VDP). This allows for full image and text variability within a printed book.
With the advent of online 3D printing services such as Shapeways and Ponoko we are seeing personalization enter into the realms of product design.

Promotional merchandise 
Promotional items (mugs, T-shirts, keychains, balls etc.) are regularly personalized. Personalized children's storybooks—wherein the child becomes the protagonist, with the name and image of the child personalized—are also popular. Personalized CDs for children also exist. With the advent of digital printing, personalized calendars that start in any month, birthday cards, cards, e-cards, posters and photo books can also be obtained.

3D printing 
3D printing is a production method that allows to create unique and personalized items on a global scale. Personalized apparel and accessories, such as jewellery, are increasing in popularity. This kind of customization is also relevant in other areas like consumer electronics and retail. By combining 3D printing with complex software a product can easily be customized by an end-user.

Role of customers

Mass personalization 

Mass personalization is defined as custom tailoring by a company in accordance with its end users' tastes and preferences. From a collaborative engineering perspective, mass customization can be viewed as collaborative efforts between customers and manufacturers, who have different sets of priorities and need to jointly search for solutions that best match customers' individual specific needs with manufacturers' customization capabilities. The main difference between mass customization and mass personalization is that customization is the ability of a company to allow its customers to create and choose a product to certain specifications, but does have limits.

One example of mass personalization: 
A website knowing a user's location and buying habits will offer suggestions tailored to that user's demographics. Each user is classified by some relevant trait (location, age, and so forth) and then given personalization aimed at that group. This means that the personalization is not individual to that singular user, it only pinpoints a specific trait that matches them up with a larger group of people. 

Behavioral targeting represents a concept that is similar to mass personalization.

Predictive personalization 

Predictive personalization is defined as the ability to predict customer behavior, needs or wants - and tailor offers and communications very precisely.  Social data is one source of providing this predictive analysis, particularly social data that is structured.  Predictive personalization is a much more recent means of personalization and can be used well to augment current personalization offerings. Predictive personalization has become plays an especially important role in online grocers, where users, especially recurring clients, have come to expect "smart shopping lists" - algorithm that predict what products they need based on similar customers and past shopping behaviours.

See also

References

External links
 International Institute on Mass Customization & Personalization which organizes MCP, a biannual conference on customization and personalization
 User Modeling and User-Adapted Interaction (UMUAI) The Journal of Personalization Research  

Human–computer interaction
User interface techniques
Personas
Types of marketing
Information retrieval techniques